This article displays a list of Primeira Liga hat-tricks. The goals scored represent players who have scored three goals (a hat-trick) or more in a single league match in Portugal's top football division. The players displayed in the article who have scored hat-tricks are listed from the 1985–86 Primeira Divisão season onwards. 

Since the 1934–35 season, more than one hundred players have scored hat-tricks in Portugal's top division. Twenty five players have scored more than three goals in a match; of these, José Águas, Eusébio and Fernando Gomes have scored six goals; Artur Jorge, Nené, Héctor Yazalde, Manuel Fernandes, Rui Jordão, Ricky, Mário Jardel, Nuno Gomes and Barata have scored five; José Torres, Vítor Baptista, Folha, Djão, Mats Magnusson, Domingos Paciência, Jorge Cadete, Fary Faye, Derlei, Liédson Carlos Bueno, Bas Dost and Edinho have scored four.

Fernando Peyroteo has scored three or more goals forty four times in the Primeira Liga, more than any other player. Fernando Gomes is second with thirty one hat-tricks; Eusébio has scored twenty nine. Eusébio holds the record for the most hat-tricks score in a single season with 6 in the 1972–73 Primeira Liga. Fernando Gomes holds the record for the quickest Primeira Liga hat-trick, netting three times against Farense in seven minutes on the 29 May 1988.

The fixture between Benfica and Alcobaça, at Estádio da Luz in 1983, saw Diamantino and Nené score a hat-trick and a poker for the home team. In 1997, Nuno Gomes and Jimmy Floyd Hasselbaink scored an hat-trick for Boavista against Gil Vicente. In 1998, Campomaiorense's Demétrius and Sporting CP's Paulo Alves both scored hat-tricks in a match that Sporting won 3–5.

Twenty two players have each scored hat-tricks for two different clubs: Rui Águas, Vítor Baptista, Paulinho Cascavel, César, José Costa, Derlei, Diamantino, Edgar, Edinho, Fernando Gomes, Nuno Gomes, Mário Jardel, Rui Jordão, Jorge Andrade, Lima, Albert Meyong, António Oliveira, Elpídio Silva, João Tomás, José Torres, and Paulinho. Six players have each scored hat-tricks for three different clubs: Vítor Baptista (Vitória de Setúbal, Benfica and Boavista), Nélson Fernandes (Varzim, Benfica and Sporting CP), Manuel Fernandes (CUF Barreiro, Sporting CP and Vitória de Setúbal), Jorge Silva (Amora, Boavista and Benfica), Edmílson (Salgueiros, Porto and Sporting CP), Edmilson Lucena (Nacional, Marítimo and Vitória de Guimarães).

Seven players – Eusébio, Fernando Gomes, Emil Kostadinov, Mário Jardel, Óscar Cardozo, Bas Dost and Darwin Núñez – have scored hat-tricks in two consecutive league games. 

Four players have scored hat-tricks and still ended up on the losing side: Tito, Fernando, Demétrius and Albert Meyong. Ten players have scored hat-tricks in games that ended in a draw: Chico Gordo,  Manuel Fernandes, Rui Jordão, Marlon Brandão, Ricky, Henry Antchouet, Buba Yohanna, Lito, Pizzi, Mario Rondón and Guilherme Schettine.

Fernando Gomes, Rosário, Herivelto, Rafael Jacques, Paulo Vida and Carlos Bueno have scored hat-tricks as a substitute.

Artur Jorge, Eusébio, Jordão, Manuel Fernandes, João Vieira Pinto and Óscar Cardozo hava scored hat-tricks in the Derby de Lisboa. Lemos and Rui Águas have scored in the Clássico. António Oliveira, Jordão and Cristian Tello have scored in the match between Porto and Sporting CP.

Hat-tricks

Statistics

Multiple hat-tricks
The following table lists the players who scored multiple hat-tricks.

Hat-tricks by nationality
The following table lists the number of hat-tricks scored by players from a single nation.

Hat-tricks by club
The following table lists the number of hat-tricks scored by clubs.

See also
 List of Bundesliga hat-tricks
 List of Ligue 1 hat-tricks
 List of La Liga hat-tricks
 List of Premier League hat-tricks
 List of Serie A hat-tricks

References

Bibliography

 

hat-tricks
hat-tricks
Primeira Liga